Dinarda is a genus of beetles belonging to the family Staphylinidae.

The species of this genus are found in Europe.

Species:
 Dinarda africana Bernhauer, 1917 
 Dinarda dentata (Gravenhorst, 1806)

References

Staphylinidae
Staphylinidae genera